Miss America 2011 was the 84th Miss America pageant. Since the first Miss America pageant was held  years ago, in 1921, the Miss America Organization was celebrating its 90th anniversary in 2011.

It was held at the Theatre for the Performing Arts of Planet Hollywood Resort and Casino on the Las Vegas Strip in Paradise, Nevada on Saturday, January 15, 2011. Miss America 2010, Caressa Cameron from Virginia, crowned her successor Teresa Scanlan from Nebraska at the end of this event. Scanlan became the first representative from Nebraska to win the Miss America title.

Delegates from the 50 states and the District of Columbia, Virgin Islands, and Puerto Rico competed for the title of Miss America 2011. The pageant was broadcast live on ABC. This was the first pageant telecast on ABC since Miss America 2005.

The judges were Joy Behar from ABC's The View, Miss America 1990 Debbye Turner Bell, television executive producer Mark Cherry, dancer Tony Dovolani from Dancing with the Stars, actress Marilu Henner, orthopedic surgeon and shoe designer Taryn Rose, and country singer Mark Wills.

Results

Placements

* – America's Choice

** – Contestant's Choice

Awards
The Miss America 2011 scholarship award winners are:

Preliminary awards

Quality of Life award

Other awards

Delegates
The Miss America 2011 delegates were:

1 Age at the time of the Miss America pageant

References

External links
 Miss America official website

2011
2011 in the United States
2011 beauty pageants
2011 in Nevada
Zappos Theater
January 2011 events in the United States